Avalon is an island in the Arthurian legend.

Avalon may also refer to:

Arts, entertainment, and media

Comics
Avalon (Marvel Comics), a fictional island

Film and television
Avalon (1990 film), a film by Barry Levinson
Avalon (2001 film), a Japanese/Polish film by Mamoru Oshii
Avalon (2011 film), a Swedish drama film directed by Axel Petersén
"Avalon" (Stargate SG-1), the first two episodes of the ninth season of Stargate SG-1
Avalon Entertainment, a television production and management company co-founded by Jon Thoday

Games
Avalon (video game), a 1984 video game
Avalon: The Legend Lives, a text-based online game series
Avalon, a King Arthur-themed variant to the game The Resistance

Literature
Avalon (novel), a 1965 novel by Anya Seton
Avalon Series, a series of novels by Marion Zimmer Bradley
Avalon: Web of Magic, a series of children's fantasy novels by the American author Rachel Roberts

Music

Bands
Avalon (Finnish band), a metal opera project formed in 2013
Avalon (American group), a contemporary Christian music group formed in 1995
Avalon (Swedish group), a 1999–2008 duo made up of the Swedish-Congolese brothers Djo and Mohombi Moupondo

Albums
Avalon (Anthony Green album), 2008
Avalon (Avalon album), 1996
Avalon (Chaos Divine album) or the title song, 2008
Avalon (Julian Lage and Chris Eldridge album), 2014
Avalon (Roxy Music album) or the title song (see below), 1982
Avalon (Sully Erna album) or the title song, 2010
Avalon (soundtrack), from the film Avalon, 1990
Avalon: The Greatest Hits, by Avalon, 2009
Avalon Los Angeles CA 24/06/06, by Sasha, 2006
Avalon (EP), by Gabrielle Aplin, 2017

Songs
"Avalon" (Al Jolson song), 1920
"Avalon" (Lovebugs song), 2006
"Avalon" (Professor Green song), 2012
"Avalon" (Roxy Music song), 1982
"Avalon", by Bad Religion from The Dissent of Man, 2010
"Avalon", by Blackmore's Night from Under a Violet Moon, 1999
"Avalon", by Foxygen from Hang, 2017
"Avalon", by Gamma Ray from Empire of the Undead, 2014
"Avalon", by Juliet Richardson, 2005
"Avalon", by Sigur Rós from Ágætis byrjun, 1999
"Avalon", by Slash featuring Myles Kennedy and the Conspirators from World on Fire, 2014
"Avalon", by Taku Iwasaki for JoJo's Bizarre Adventure (TV series), 2013
"Isle of Avalon", by Iron Maiden from The Final Frontier, 2010

Businesses
 Avalon Books, a New York-based book publishing imprint (1950–2012), purchased by Amazon.com
 Avalon Guitars, a Northern Ireland guitar manufacturer
 Avalon Hill, an American game company that specializes in wargames and strategic board games
 Avalon Hotel, in Gothenburg, Sweden
 Avalon Hotel (Beverly Hills), in California, US
 Avalon Hotel (Rochester, Minnesota), US
 Avalon Interactive, a defunct video game distribution company
 Avalon Mall, St. Johns, Newfoundland and Labrador, Canada
 Avalon Publishing Group (1994–2007), a New York publisher, absorbed by Perseus Books Group
 Avalon Rare Metals, a mineral development company focused on rare metal deposits in Canada
 Avalon Studios, a film and television studio, located in Avalon, New Zealand
 Avalon Waterways, an American ship and river cruise line owned by Globus
 Chateau Avalon, Kansas City, Kansas, US, a luxury hotel and bed and breakfast 
 Radio Avalon, a pirate radio station near Glastonbury, England, in 1983, later a legally recognised station

People

Given name 
 Avalon Biddle (born 1992), motorcycle racer from New Zealand
 Avalon Daggett (1907–2002), American filmmaker
 Avalon Emerson (born 1988), American electronic music producer and DJ
 Avalon Robbins (born 2001), American model and actress

Surname 
Frankie Avalon (born 1940), American actor, singer, and former teen idol born Francis Thomas Avallone
Mickey Avalon, American rapper Yeshe Perl (born 1975)
Whitney Avalon, American YouTuber
Arthur Avalon, pseudonym of Sir John Woodroffe (1865–1936), British Orientalist and translator

Places

Australia
Avalon, Victoria
Avalon Airport in Victoria, Australia
Avalon Beach, New South Wales, a suburb of Sydney known until 2012 as Avalon
Australian International Airshow, sometimes called the Avalon Airshow after its hosting airport

Canada
Avalon (electoral district), Newfoundland
Avalon, Ottawa, a neighborhood in a suburb of the city of Ottawa, Ontario
Avalon, Saskatoon, a neighbourhood in the city of Saskatoon, Saskatchewan
Avalon Peninsula, Newfoundland
Province of Avalon, Newfoundland

United States
The Avalon (Birmingham, Alabama), or "The Avalon", apartment buildings listed on the National Register of Historic Places (NRHP)
Avalon, California, the only city on Santa Catalina Island
Avalon (Alpharetta, Georgia), a planned mixed-use development
Avalon, Georgia, a town
Avalon (New Windsor, Maryland), a historic home listed on the NRHP
Avalon, Mississippi, an unincorporated community
Avalon, Missouri, an unincorporated community
Avalon, New Jersey, a barrier island resort community
Avalon, North Carolina, an abandoned mill town
Avalon, Pennsylvania, a borough
Avalon, Texas, an unincorporated community
Avalon, Virginia, an unincorporated community
Avalon, Wisconsin, an unincorporated community
Avalon Dam, on the Pecos River near Carlsbad, New Mexico
Avalon State Park, North Hutchinson Island, Florida
Mount Avalon, New Hampshire

Other places
Avalon, France, a village outside of Pontcharra, Isère, France
Avalon, New Zealand, a suburb of Lower Hutt, New Zealand
Avalon Cemetery, in Soweto, South Africa

Technology
Avalon, the codename for Windows Presentation Foundation, a user interface API designed by Microsoft
Apache Avalon, a computer software framework
Avalon switch fabric, the peripheral interface used in Altera's Nios II embedded processor

Transportation
For ships, see List of ships named Avalon
Avalon (Los Angeles Metro station), on the Metro Green Line
Avalon (MPV) a Sri Lankan armoured vehicle
Avalon (RTA Rapid Transit station), a station stop on the RTA Blue Line in Cleveland, Ohio
Avalon Boulevard, a north–south thoroughfare in Los Angeles County
Independence Avalon, a German paraglider design
Toyota Avalon, a sedan car produced from 1994
Toyota Avalon (concept), a concept car introduced at the 1991 Tokyo Auto Show

Other uses
Avalon Hollywood, Los Angeles, California
Avalon Foundation, founded by Ailsa Mellon-Bruce in 1940 and later merged into the Andrew W. Mellon Foundation
Sakura Avalon, the Cardcaptors name for the titular Cardcaptor Sakura fictional character, Sakura Kinomoto

See also
Avalon School (disambiguation)
Avalon Theater (disambiguation)

Avallon, Burgundy, France, a commune
Avalonia or Avalon terrane, an ancient microcontinent